Yepez is a surname. Notable people with the surname include:

Enrique Espín Yépez (1926–1997), Ecuadorean composer
Juan Yepez (born 1998), Venezuelan baseball player
María Fernanda Yépez (born 1980), Colombian actress
Ney Yépez Cortés (born 1968), Ecuadorian writer
Olavo Yépez (1937–2021), Ecuadorian chess master
Trotzky Augusto Yepez Obando (1940–2010), Ecuadorian chess player

See also
Yepes (surname)

Spanish-language surnames